Bagh-e Yolmeh Salian (also Romanized as Bāgh-e Yolmeh Sālīān) is a village in Sheykh Musa Rural District, in the Central District of Aqqala County, Golestan Province, Iran. At the 2006 census, its population was 196, in 32 families.

References 

Populated places in Aqqala County